Paisiy Peak rises to approximately 550 m in the Delchev Ridge, Tangra Mountains, eastern Livingston Island in the South Shetland Islands, Antarctica surmounting Sopot Ice Piedmont to the north and east.

The peak is named after St. Paisiy Hilendarski (St. Paisius of Chilendar, 1722–73), a famous figure of the Bulgarian National Revival, and author of the book ‘Slavonic-Bulgarian History: On the People, Bulgarian Czars and Saints, and All Bulgarian Deeds and Events’.

Location

Maps
 L.L. Ivanov et al. Antarctica: Livingston Island and Greenwich Island, South Shetland Islands. Scale 1:100000 topographic map. Sofia: Antarctic Place-names Commission of Bulgaria, 2005.
 L.L. Ivanov. Antarctica: Livingston Island and Greenwich, Robert, Snow and Smith Islands. Scale 1:120000 topographic map.  Troyan: Manfred Wörner Foundation, 2009.  
 L.L. Ivanov. Antarctica: Livingston Island and Smith Island. Scale 1:100000 topographic map. Manfred Wörner Foundation, 2017.

References
 Paisiy Peak. SCAR Composite Antarctic Gazetteer
 Bulgarian Antarctic Gazetteer. Antarctic Place-names Commission. (details in Bulgarian, basic data in English)

External links
 Paisiy Peak. Copernix satellite image

Tangra Mountains